Mayhew Folger (March 9, 1774 – September 1, 1828) was an American whaler who captained the sealing ship Topaz that rediscovered the Pitcairn Islands in 1808, while one of 's mutineers was still living.

Early life and family
Mayhew was born on March 12, 1774, in Nantucket, Massachusetts, the second child of William Folger and Ruth Coffin. Mayhew was a member of the Folger whaling family of Nantucket, who were prominent Quakers.  He was the great-great-great grandson of Peter Foulger and Mary Morrill Foulger and, through them, is the first cousin, three times removed, of Benjamin Franklin.

He married his second cousin, Mary Joy, on March 7, 1798, on Nantucket. Mayhew was the uncle of Lucretia Coffin Mott, daughter of his sister, Anna Folger, and Thomas Coffin. Folgers grandson, William Mayhew Folger (1844-1928), became a United States Navy rear admiral.

Rediscovery of the Pitcairn Islands
Mayhew Folger captained the ship Topaz that left Boston on April 5, 1807, hunting for seals.  They rediscovered the Pitcairn Islands on February 6, 1808.  At that time, only one of the original  mutineers, Alexander Smith, whose real name was John Adams, was still alive. Topaz remained at the island for only ten hours.

==The Bounty'''s Chronometer==
Captain Folger was given the Bounty's azimuth compass and Larcum Kendall K2 marine chronometer by Adams. The K2 was the third precision marine chronometer made after the H4, designed by John Harrison.  The chronometer was taken by the Spanish governor at Juan Fernandez Island.  The chronometer was later purchased by a Spaniard named Castillo.  When he died, his family conveyed it to Captain Herbert of HMS Calliope, who had it conveyed to the British Museum around 1840.  The chronometer is now in Greenwich, London.

Accounts of the rediscovery
The discovery was reported by Folger to the Royal Navy in 1808, a report of which reached the British Admiralty on May 14, 1809, which was then published in the Quarterly Review in 1810. Captain Folger also related an account of the discovery to a friend, Captain Amasa Delano, who published it in his book, A Narrative of Voyages and Travels in 1817;  the narrative is also included in the book Pitcairn's Island'', written by Charles Nordoff and James Hall.

Later years
Folger and his family migrated to Kendal, Ohio in 1813. He became the first postmaster of neighboring Massillon, Ohio when the post office was created there in 1828. He died September 1, 1828 in Massillon.

See also
 History of the Pitcairn Islands
 A quote about the Folger family from Herman Melville is in the entry for Mary Morrill.

External links
Mayhew Folger's account of meeting the Bounty descendants
The Quarterly Review article of 1810
Book by Nordoff and Hall which includes Folger's account of the rediscovery
Another link to Nordoff and Hall's book
 The Larcum Kendall Bounty Watch in the National Maritime Museum

References

1774 births
1828 deaths
People from Nantucket, Massachusetts
Benjamin Franklin
Sea captains
Mutiny on the Bounty
Sealers
American people in whaling
American explorers of the Pacific